Kuwait television channel 2 (KTV2) is Kuwait's governmental television channel dedicated for the English-speaking public. The channel broadcasts English-speaking shows, local programmes, news, English-subtitled local serials, English-speaking international serials, and English-speaking or English-subtitled movies. Kuwait television started its broadcast on November 15, 1961; as the official television of the ministry of information of the state of Kuwait. There are so far five channels: channel 1 (Al-Oula, KTV1), used for Arabic programming; channel 2 (KTV2); channel 3 (KTV3 or sport), for purely sports programming; channel 4 (KTV4), for pre-recorded and re-runs of movies and serials from other channels; and channel 5 (KTV-Plus), Kuwait's official governmental satellite broadcast, currently merged with KTV1. The Kuwait Ministry of Information has an online feed of three of its channels.

Programs

Former

Imported shows

Action
 The A-Team
 Hardcastle and McCormick
 The Highwayman
 Knight Rider
 L.A. Heat
 MacGyver
 A Man Called Hawk
 Miami Vice
 Sea Hunt

Animated shows
 ABC Weekend Special
 The Addams Family
 The Adventures of Blinky Bill
 The Adventures of Dawdle the Donkey
 The Adventures of Raggedy Ann and Andy
 Amigo and Friends
 The Animal Shelf
 The Animals of Farthing Wood
 Animaniacs
 Babar
 The Baby Huey Show
 Batman: The Animated Series
 The Berenstain Bears
 Big Dog, Little Dog
 Biker Mice From Mars
 Bionic Six
 Bob the Builder
 The Bots Master
 BraveStarr
 Cadillacs and Dinosaurs
 Captain Planet and the Planeteers
 The Care Bears
 The Care Bears Family
 Casper and Friends
 Cave Kids
 The Centurions
 Chip 'n Dale: Rescue Rangers
 Dennis the Menace
 Denver, the Last Dinosaur
 Dexter's Laboratory
 Dinky Di's
 Dinosaucers
 Diplodos
 Disney's Adventures of the Gummi Bears
 Dragon Flyz
 DuckTales
 Ed, Edd n Eddy
 The Enchanted House
 Fantastic Max
 Flitze Firetooth
 Foofur
 Galtar and the Golden Lance
 Garfield and Friends
 The Get Along Gang
 Heathcliff
 Hello Kitty's Furry Tale Theater
 Help!... It's the Hair Bear Bunch!
 Inspector Gadget
 The Karate Kid
 Kimba the White Lion
 The Legends of Treasure Island
 Little Bear
 The Little Rascals
 Loggerheads
 The Lone Ranger
 Macron 1
 The Magic School Bus
 The Magical World of Gigi
 Marvel Action Hour
 The Mask: Animated Series
 MGM Cartoon Classics
 My Little Pony
 My Pet Monster
 M.A.S.K.
 The New Adventures of Winnie the Pooh
 The New Adventures of Zorro
 The New Three Stooges
 Noveltoons
 Paw Paws
 Pingu
 Pink Panther and Sons
 Pokémon
 Pole Position
 Police Academy
 Popeye and Son
 Popples
 Postman Pat
 The Raccoons
 Rainbow Brite
 The Real Adventures of Jonny Quest
 The Real Ghostbusters
 The Ren & Stimpy Show
 Rubik, the Amazing Cube
 Rugrats
 Scooby-Doo
 The Scooby-Doo Show
 She-Ra: Princess of Power
 SilverHawks
 Sooty's Amazing Adventures
 The Smurfs
 Sylvanian Families
 Tabaluga
 Teenage Mutant Ninja Turtles
 ThunderCats
 The Transformers
 Trollkins
 Ultraforce
 Voltron: Defender of the Universe
 Walt Disney Cartoon Classics
 Walt Disney's Mickey and Donald
 Warner Bros. Cartoons
 Wildfire
 Yogi's Treasure Hunt

Children's Programmes
 3-2-1 Contact
 ABC Afterschool Specials
 The Adventures of Pete and Pete
 The Animal Express
 Barney & Friends
 Bay City Rollers
 Beakman's World
 Break Point
 Butterfly Island
 Captain Power and the Soldiers of the Future
 Chicken Minute
 Chocky
 Chocky's Challenge
 Chocky's Children
 Dani's House
 Deepwater Haven
 Double Dare
 The Electric Company
 Electronic Office
 Emma and Grandpa
 Eureeka's Castle
 Faerie Tale Theatre
 Finders Keepers
 The Fire-Raiser
 Finger Tips
 The Friends of My Forest
 Fun House
 The Genie From Down Under
 God's Wonderful Railway
 Groundling Marsh
 Hi-5
 Interbang
 Iris, The Happy Professor
 Just for the Record
 The Kids of Degrassi Street
 The Kidsongs Television Show
 Kratts' Creatures
 The Krofft Superstar Hour
 Legends of the Hidden Temple
 Lift Off
 Mac & Muttley
 The Micro at Work
 Moon Jumper
 Mr. Wizard's World
 My Secret Identity
 Nickelodeon Guts
 Night of the Red Hunter
 Not Another Science Show
 OWL/TV
 Pals
 Power Rangers
 Press Gang
 Professor Lobster
 Pugwall
 Pumpkin Patch
 The Reppies
 Road to Avonlea
 Runaway Bay
 Samson Superslug
 Sam's Luck
 The Scheme of Things
 The Scientific Eye
 Sea Urchins
 Seal Morning
 Sesame Street
 Ship to Shore
 Spellbinder
 Square One Television
 Standby...Lights! Camera! Action!
 Steel Riders
 Take Hart
 Teletubbies
 Theodore Tugboat
 T. and T.
 Wonderstruck
 Woof!

Drama
 Adderly
 The Adventures of Brisco County Jr.
 African Skies
 Airwolf
 Automan
 The Beachcombers
 Beauty and the Beast
 Bergerac
 Blue Heelers
 The Blue Knight
 Booker
 Bordertown
 Call Me Mister
 The Challenge
 Champagne Charlie
 CHiPS
 Danger Bay
 A Dangerous Life
 Diamonds
 Dr. Quinn, Medicine Woman
 The Equalizer
 Erebus: The Aftermath
 ER
 The Family Tree
 Farscape
 The Flying Doctors
 The Fourth Arm
 The Franchise Affair
 Great Expectations
 Hanlon
 High Mountain Rangers
 Highlander: The Series
 Homicide: Life on the Street
 Hooperman
 Hoover vs. The Kennedys
 Hunter
 In the Heat of the Night
 Jack and Mike
 Jake and the Fatman
 Jim Henson's The Storyteller
 J.J. Starbuck
 Katts and Dog
 The Lancaster Miller Affair
 The Last Season
 The Lazarus Man
 Les Faucheurs de marguerites
 Life Goes On
 Lonesome Dove: The Series
 L.A. Law
 Magnum, P.I.
 The Man from Snowy River
 Matlock
 Max Headroom
 Midnight Caller
 Moonlighting
 Morningstar/Eveningstar
 Murder, She Wrote
 Murphy's Law
 Northern Exposure
 Ohara
 The Oldest Rookie
 Oshin
 Our House
 The Paper Chase
 Peaceable Kingdom
 A Perfect Spy
 A Place to Call Home
 Pride and Prejudice
 Private Eye
 Quantum Leap
 Quincy, M.E.
 Q.E.D.
 Rags to Riches
 Return to Eden
 The Saint
 seaQuest DSV
 The Secrets of Lake Success
 Shōgun
 Simon & Simon
 Sirens
 Sisters
 Sliders
 Sonny Spoon
 Space Precinct
 Spenser: For Hire
 Star Trek: The Next Generation
 Starman
 Street Hawk
 Street Legal
 Studio 5-B
 Tanamera – Lion of Singapore
 TekWar
 Tour of Duty
 Treasure Island in Outer Space
 Troubles
 The Twilight Zone
 Unsub
 The Untouchables
 Walker, Texas Ranger
 Watch All Night
 White Fang
 Wiseguy
 Wolf
 The Wonder Years
 Xena: Warrior Princess
 A Year in the Life
 Zorro

Sports
 Fishing the West
 The Spectacular World of Guinness Records
 Wacky World of Sports

Detective
 The Law & Harry McGraw
 Simon & Simon

Game Shows
 The Crystal Maze
 Fort Boyard

Comedy
 227
 ALF
 America's Funniest Home Videos
 Annie McGuire
 Benson
 Better Days
 Blossom
 Bonnie
 Bustin' Loose
 Charles in Charge
 The Charmings
 Coach
 Coming of Age
 The Cosby Show
 Dave's World
 A Different World
 Diff'rent Strokes
 Dinosaurs
 The Duck Factory
 Ellen
 Everybody Loves Raymond
 Everything's Relative
 Family Matters
 Fresh Fields
 The Fresh Prince of Bel-Air
 Full House
 The Golden Palace
 Growing Pains
 Hey Dad..!
 Hit Squad
 The Hogan Family
 I Married Dora
 It'll Be Alright on the Night
 Just for Laughs
 Just the Ten of Us
 Kate & Allie
 Learning the Ropes
 The Lucy Show
 Mad About You
 Married... with Children
 Mind Your Language
 Mr. Belvedere
 The Munsters Today
 Murphy Brown
 The New Adventures of Beans Baxter
 Night Court
 The Nutt House
 Open All Hours
 Out of This World
 The Parent 'Hood
 Perfect Strangers
 Pokerface
 Private Benjamin
 The Pursuit of Happiness
 The Robert Guillaume Show
 Roseanne
 Saved by the Bell
 Sidekicks
 Sledge Hammer!
 Spitting Image
 Throb
 Thunder Alley
 Together We Stand
 The Tracey Ullman Show
 TV Bloopers & Practical Jokes
 The Two of Us
 Valerie
 The Wayans Bros.
 What a Country!
 What's Happening Now!!
 You Can't Take It with You

Magazine
 Bodymatters
 Cybernet
 Martha Stewart Living
 Movies, Games and Videos
 Smithsonian World

Space Opera
 Babylon 5

Education
Encyclopædia Britannica

Documentary
 The American Century
 Animals of Africa
 Around the World in 80 Days with Michael Palin
 The Australian Ark
 Beyond 2000
 Body Matters
 The Craft of the Potter
 Computers in Control
 COPS
 Cousteau's Rediscovery of the World I
 A Day in the Life
 Dive to Adventure
 Equinox
 A Finite World: Global Population Problems and Solutions
 Footsteps
 The Great Wall of Iron
 The Health Show
 Horizon
 In the Shadow of Fujisan
 The Infinite Voyager
 Just the Job
 Life and Death
 National Geographic Specials
 Natural World
 The Ocean World of John Stoneman
 On the Wings of the Wind
 Orphans of the Wild
 Path of the Rain God
 Perspective
 The Politics of Food
 Portrait of the Soviet Union
 The Real West
 Rescue 911
 The Road to War
 Safari to Adventure
 Sea Power
 Scuba World
 The Seal Morning
 Supersense
 Talk to the Animals
 Trials of Life
 The Ultimate Machine
 Weird and Wonderful
 Wild America
 Wild Kingdom
 Wildlife in Australia
 Wildlife on One
 The World About Us
 World of Survival
 The Yellow River

Western
 Paradise

Entertainment
 Great Circuses of the World

Anthology
 The Alfred Hitchcock Hour
 Alfred Hitchcock Presents
 The Magical World of Disney
 Tales from the Darkside
 Tales of the Unexpected
 The Twilight Zone

Variety
 The Mickey Mouse Club

Soap Opera
 Falcon Crest
 The Yellow Rose

Reality
 America's Funniest People
 Incredible Sunday
 More Real People

References

Television stations in Kuwait
English-language television stations
Television channels and stations established in 1961